Al-Kafrayn was a Palestinian village in the Haifa Subdistrict. It was depopulated during the 1947–48 Civil War in Mandatory Palestine on 12 April 1948 as part of the Battle of Mishmar HaEmek. It was located 29.5 km southeast of Haifa.

History
The Crusaders referred to al-Kafrayn as Caforana.

Ottoman era
In 1859, Kefrein was estimated to have a population of 200, who cultivated 30 feddans.

In 1882, the PEF's Survey of Western Palestine described it as "a village of moderate size, on the west side of the watershed, with a spring on that side."

A population list from about 1887 showed that  Kefrein had about 485 inhabitants, all Muslim.

British Mandate era
In the 1922 census of Palestine conducted by the British Mandate authorities, Al Kufrain had a population 571; 569 Muslims, 
and 2 Orthodox Christians, increasing in the  1931 census to 657,  all  Muslims, in a total of 95 houses.

In the 1945 statistics, the village had a population of 920 Muslims,
and the total land area was 10,882 dunams. Of the land,  147  dunams was for plantations and irrigable land,  for cereals, while 18 dunams were built-up (urban) land.

1948 and aftermath
Al-Kafrayn became depopulated in April 1948 after military assault by Yishuv forces.
11–12 April 1948, the same day it was occupied, the Yishuv forces blew up some 30 of Kafrayns houses.

On 19 April 1948, the Palmach held an exercise in al-Kafrayn and afterwards they blew up the rest of the village.

Most of the villagers ended up in tent homes in the Jenin area, appealing to the AHC: "Thousands of poor women and children from the villages of Abu Zureiq and Mansi and Ghubayya and Kafrin and other places near the colony of Mishmar Ha‘emek, whose houses the Jews have destroyed and whose babies and old people [the Jews] have killed, are now in the villages around Jenin without help and dying of hunger. We ask you to repair the situation . . . and do everything to quickly send forces of vengeance against the Jews and restore us to our lands."

Following the war the area was incorporated into the State of Israel. An Israeli military training camp was later built on the village's land.

In 1992, the remains  were described: "The site and its surrounding area are divided between a military training camp and a cow pasture. A rubble-filled has been fenced in and is covered with dirt, underbrush and thorns. Almond,olive and fig trees are scattered around the site."

References

Bibliography

External links
Welcome To al-Kafrayn
al-Kafrayn,  Zochrot
Survey of Western Palestine, Map 8:  IAA, Wikimedia commons
al-Kafrayn,  from the Khalil Sakakini Cultural Center
"Chronicles of a Piece of Jewelry"
  Response to "Chronicles of a Piece of Jewelry" by Eitan Bronstein, Hakkibutz, Feb. 8, 2007,  Zochrot
 Tour of Kafrayn, 10.2.07, Zochrot
  Booklet about Kafrayn, downloadable, from  Zochrot

Arab villages depopulated prior to the 1948 Arab–Israeli War
District of Haifa